Warren Clymer (December 29, 1922 – July 16, 2007) was an American art director, production designer and set decorator. He won two Primetime Emmy Awards and was nominated for five more in the category Outstanding Art Direction for his work on the television programs Frontiers of Faith and Hallmark Hall of Fame. Clymer died in July 2007 in Manhattan, New York, at the age of 84.

References

External links 

1922 births
2007 deaths
People from Davenport, Iowa
American art directors
American production designers
American set decorators
Primetime Emmy Award winners
University of Iowa alumni
Indiana University alumni